Rignieux-le-Franc is a commune in the Ain department in eastern France.

History

Property of Alphonse-Louis du Plessis de Richelieu and coming from Fontaines-sur-Saône, an early Christian sarcophagus was stored in Rignieux-le-Franc, before being bought by the Louvre in 1864.

At the end of the 16th century, the lands of Rignieux-le-Franc belonged to the Saillans de Brézenaud.

Population

Geography
Rignieux-le-Franc is located about 6 kilometers (3 miles) of Pérouges classified among Les plus Beau Villages de France .

The Toison, a tributary of the Ain, flows through the commune.

References

Communes of Ain
Ain communes articles needing translation from French Wikipedia